The Adventures of Rad Gravity is an action-adventure platform game for the Nintendo Entertainment System developed by Interplay and published by Activision in 1990. Rad Gravity is the name of the game's hero.

The story is that in the far future, humans colonized many planets and established a form a biotechnology, which were sentient beings called Compuminds, which could communicate rapidly from world to world. The game's villain had shut down all the Compuminds and hid them. Eventually one of the Compuminds, named Kakos, was found. Together, Rad and Kakos must find the eight missing Compuminds, each on eight different unique planets, such as the cyberpunk world of Cyberia, the green jungle world of Sauria, and the caustic trash world of Effluvia.

The game was notable for the planet Turvia, where gravity works in reverse. In that level the protagonist was drawn upside down, as were the enemies and the entire screen. His early game attack consists of a sort of a lightsaber. A possible inspiration for Rad Gravity is the 1989 arcade game Strider, the protagonist of which uses a plasma sword and in two levels walks on the ceiling upside-down when local gravity is reversed.

Reception
The Adventures of Rad Gravity received generally positive reviews, and Simon Burns of VoxelArcade called it 'one of the most interesting and innovative of NES games' in a retro feature.

References

External links 

1990 video games
Activision games
Interplay Entertainment games
Nintendo Entertainment System-only games
Mattel video games
Nintendo Entertainment System games
Platform games
Video games scored by George Sanger
Video games set on fictional planets
Video games developed in the United States